Federal Route 200, or Jalan Bukit Bunga-Jenok-Bukit Nangka, is a federal road in Kelantan, Malaysia. It is a main route to Ban Buketa, Thailand.

Features

At most sections, the Federal Route 200 was built under the JKR R5 road standard, allowing maximum speed limit of up to 90 km/h.

List of junctions and towns

References

Malaysian Federal Roads